The  Instituto Federal de Educação, Ciência e Tecnologia do Acre (IFAC) (Acre Federal Institute of Education, Science and Technology) is an institution that offers high and professional educations by having a pluricurricular form. It is a multicampi institution, especialized in offering professional and technological education in different areas of knowledge (biologics/human sciences/exact sciences).

The  Instituto Federal de Educação, Ciência e Tecnologia do Acre (IFAC) (Acre Federal Institute of Education, Science and Technology) is a federal institution, public, directly vinculated to the Ministry of Education of Brazil.

The IFAC is a public university located in the cities of Rio Branco, Cruzeiro do Sul, Sena Madureira, Xapuri e Tarauacá.

History
The IFAC was created by law 11.892, of December 29, 2008 with transformation of the Federal Technical School of Acre in high education Instituicion.

Undergraduate programs
 Biology
 Bachelor of Business Administration
 Chemistry
 Physics
 Mathematics
 Technology in Agribusiness
 Technology in Agroecology
 Technology in Environmental management
 Technology in Information Systems
 Technology in Logistics
 Technology in School Processes
 Zootechnics

Master Programs
 Professional and Technology Education

Admissions
The selection of students for higher education is done via SISU. To access the vacancies it is necessary to have completed High School and ENEM.

See also
Federal University of Acre

References

Acre
1910 establishments in Brazil